Varfolomeyev (masculine) or Varfolomeyeva (feminine) is a Russian surname, derived from the given name "Varfolomey" (Bartholomew). Notable people with the surname include:

Dmitri Varfolomeyev (footballer, born 1993)
Dmitri Varfolomeyev (footballer, born 1978)
Ivan Varfolomeyev (born 2004), Ukrainian footballer
Sergei Varfolomeyev (born 1968), Russian footballer
Valery Varfolomeyev (born 1971), Russian naval officer

Russian-language surnames
Patronymic surnames
Surnames from given names